Dehnow-e Amlak (also Romanized as Dehnow-e Āmlāk; also known as Dehnu-e Āmlāk) is a village in Dowlatabad Rural District, in the Central District of Jiroft County, Kerman Province, Iran. At the 2006 census, its population was 674, in 132 families.

References 

Populated places in Jiroft County